Atsamaz Buziyevich Burayev (born 5 February 1990) is a Russian former professional footballer.

Club career
He made his professional debut in the Russian Second Division in 2008 for FC Avtodor Vladikavkaz.

In November 2015 he had been transferred to FC Banants.

References

External links
 
 

Russian footballers
1990 births
Sportspeople from Vladikavkaz
Living people
FC Spartak Vladikavkaz players
Russian Premier League players
FC Luch Vladivostok players
Russian expatriate footballers
Expatriate footballers in Armenia
FC Urartu players
Armenian Premier League players
Association football forwards
PFC Spartak Nalchik players
FC Mashuk-KMV Pyatigorsk players